The 2008 Minnesota–Duluth Bulldogs football team was an American football team that won the 2008 NCAA Division II national championship.

The team represented the University of Minnesota Duluth in the Northern Sun Intercollegiate Conference (NSIC) during the 2008 NCAA Division II football season. In their sixth, non-consecutive season under head coach Bob Nielson, the Bulldogs compiled a perfect 15–0 record, outscored opponents by a total of 613 to 173, and won the NSIC championship. The team advanced to the playoffs and won the national championship by defeating  in the championship game.

The team's statistical leaders included Isaac Odim with 1,638 rushing yards and 180 points scored, Ted Schlafke with 3,018 passing yards and 3,513 yards of total offense, and D.J. Winfield with 1,201 receiving yards.

The team played its home games at James S. Malosky Stadium in Duluth, Minnesota.

Schedule

References

Minnesota–Duluth
Minnesota Duluth Bulldogs football seasons
Northern Sun Intercollegiate Conference football champion seasons
NCAA Division II Football Champions
College football undefeated seasons
Minnesota–Duluth Bulldogs football